Liuqiao may refer to the following locations in China: 

 Liuqiao Subdistrict (刘桥街道), Xiangshan District, Huaibei, Anhui
 Liuqiao, Suixi County (刘桥镇), town in Anhui
 Liuqiao, Fusui County (柳桥镇), town in Guangxi
 Liuqiao, Nantong (刘桥镇), town in Tongzhou District, Nantong, Jiangsu